Paul Hanmer (born 1961, Cape Town) is a South African jazz pianist.

Career
As a child he studied piano. He attended the University of Cape Two for two years before beginning a music career with guitarist Paul Petersen. During the 1980s he started the band Unofficial Language with Peter Sklair and Ian Herman in Johannesburg. In the 1990s he was a member of the Cool Friction Band led by Tony Cox. His debut album, Trains to Taung, was released by Sheer Sound in 1997. Influenced by Keith Jarrett, he has worked with Miriam Makeba, Louis Mhlanga, Pops Mohamed, McCoy Mrubata, Ray Phiri, and Tananas.

Discography 
 Trains to Taung (Sheer Sound, 1997)
 Playola (Sheer Sound, 2000)
 Window to Elsewhere (Sheer Sound, 2002)

References

See also
Cape jazz

1961 births
Living people
21st-century male musicians
21st-century pianists
African jazz (genre) pianists
Musicians from Cape Town
Post-bop pianists
South African composers
South African jazz musicians
South African male composers